Fialta is an indie pop band from San Luis Obispo, California. The group consists of David Provenzano and Michael Leibovich (formerly of Sherwood), Beth Clements, and Sarah Shotwell. The band formed in 2011 and released their first full-length album, ''Summer Winter',' in 2013.

The band's name was inspired by the Nabokov story, "Spring in Fialta".

The band has made a name for itself primarily through sync licensing. In 2013, Fialta's song "Summer Winter" was featured in a Kmart television ad, and in 2014, the song "Sleepytime" was used for a Chipotle sponsorship ad for the PBS show, Food Forward. Their music has also been played on the television series Awkward, A to Z, Parenthood, Degrassi, BoJack Horseman, and About a Boy.

Members

Full Time Members 

David Provenzano - Lead Vocals, Guitar, Ukulele - 2011–Present

Beth Clements - Lead Vocals, Piano, Keyboards - 2011–Present

Michael Leibovich - Keyboards, Piano, Trumpet, Percussion - 2011–Present

Sarah Shotwell - Background Vocals, Piano, Keyboards - 2011–Present

Other Musicians/Crew 

James Trujillo - Bass Guitar (2011–2020)

Nick Brumme - Drums (2013–Present)

Paul Lewolt - Bass Guitar (2013–2017)

Jesse Sotelo - Drums (2011–2017)

References

Indie pop groups from California
Musical groups established in 2011
2011 establishments in California